Burfitt is a surname. Notable people with the surname include:

Brooke Burfitt (born 1988), British actress and radio presenter
Louise Burfitt-Dons (born 1953), British novelist, humanitarian, and politician
Nicholas Burfitt (born 1966), British rower

See also
Burditt
Burkitt